The Communauté de communes de la Région de Bapaume was located in the Pas-de-Calais département, in northern France. It was created in January 1993. It was merged into the new Communauté de communes du Sud-Artois in January 2013.

Composition
It comprised the following 26 communes:

Ablainzevelle  
Achiet-le-Grand  
Achiet-le-Petit 
Avesnes-lès-Bapaume  
Bancourt 
Bapaume 
Beaulencourt  
Béhagnies  
Beugnâtre  
Biefvillers-lès-Bapaume  
Bihucourt  
Bucquoy 
Douchy-lès-Ayette  
Favreuil  
Frémicourt  
Grévillers  
Le Sars  
Le Transloy 
Ligny-Thilloy  
Martinpuich  
Morval  
Riencourt-lès-Bapaume 
Sapignies  
Vaulx-Vraucourt 
Villers-au-Flos  
Warlencourt-Eaucourt

References 

Bapaume